Ronald Chavez (born ) is a retired Filipino amateur boxer who competed at the 1992 Summer Olympics and is currently one of the coaches of the Philippine national boxing team.

Career
Chavez started out as a featherweight, winning a bronze medal at the 1989 Southeast Asian Games in Kuala Lumpur.

He eventually moved up to lightweight and captured a gold medal in his division at the 1991 Southeast Asian Games in Manila.

Chavez achieved the biggest win of his boxing career at the 1992 Asian Amateur Boxing Championships in Bangkok when he captured the gold medal in the lightweight division after defeating North Korean Yun Yong-chol in the final. The win proved to be special as he also booked a ticket to the 1992 Summer Olympics.

Chavez was among six Filipino boxers who competed in Barcelona. He defeated Egypt’s Emil Rizk and Canada’s William Irwin to reach the quarterfinals of the lightweight division where he was knocked out by South Korean Hong Sung-sik.

Chavez eventually moved up to light welterweight and won a bronze medal at the 1993 Southeast Asian Games in Singapore.

He retired after failing to qualify for the 1996 Summer Olympics. Chavez eventually joined the Philippine national boxing team coaching staff after hanging up his gloves.

Results
1992 Summer Olympics

Personal life
Ronald Chavez is married to former volleyball player Zenaida Ybanez, with whom he has at least three children. Chavez's brother, Arlo as well as his son Ronald Jr. were also boxers.

References

Living people
1969 births
Boxers at the 1992 Summer Olympics
Lightweight boxers
Filipino male boxers
Olympic boxers of the Philippines
Southeast Asian Games medalists in boxing
Southeast Asian Games gold medalists for the Philippines
Southeast Asian Games competitors for the Philippines
Southeast Asian Games bronze medalists for the Philippines
Competitors at the 1989 Southeast Asian Games
Competitors at the 1991 Southeast Asian Games
Competitors at the 1993 Southeast Asian Games